John Buchanan Robinson (May 23, 1846 – January 28, 1933) was an American politician from Pennsylvania who served as a Republican member of the Pennsylvania House of Representatives for Delaware County from 1884 to 1888, the Pennsylvania State Senate for the 9th district from 1889 to 1892 and the U.S. House of Representatives for Pennsylvania's 6th congressional district from 1891 to 1897.

Early life and education

John Buchanan Robinson was born in Allegheny City, Pennsylvania and was the grandson of the politician, businessman and militia general William Robinson, Jr.

He attended private schools in Pittsburgh, entered the University of Pittsburgh and finished at Amherst College.  He enlisted in the Union Army in 1864, however the Robinson family already had two sons at the front in the Civil War and used the influence of his grandfather William Robinson, Jr. to have John released from service against his wishes.  As compensation, he was appointed a cadet  at the United States Naval Academy in Annapolis, Maryland by Congressman Thomas Williams  and graduated in 1868.    He was commissioned a Lieutenant and circumnavigated the globe on the USS Colorado.  He was a member of the second U.S. party to become audience before the Emperor of Japan.

In 1873, Robinson returned to the U.S. and served on the USS Michigan on the Great Lakes. He also served on the USS Juniata when it sailed to Santiago de Cuba to demand the release of American citizens seized on the Virignius by Spanish authorities.
 
He resigned from the Navy in 1875 and moved to Delaware County, Pennsylvania.  He studied law under John G. Johnson and was admitted to the Philadelphia bar in 1876.  In 1878, Robinson moved to Media, Pennsylvania and was admitted to the Delaware County bar.  He was also admitted to practice in the Supreme Court of Pennsylvania.

He worked as editor of the Delaware County Gazette in 1881 and 1882, and as a newspaper correspondent and owner of the Media Ledger.

Political career
Robinson served as a member of the Pennsylvania House of Representatives for the Delaware County district in 1884 and 1886 and to the Pennsylvania State Senate for the 9th district from 1889 to 1892.

Robinson was elected as a Republican to the Fifty-second, Fifty-third, and Fifty-fourth Congresses.  He was an unsuccessful candidate for reelection in 1896.

He served as president of the League of Republican Clubs of Pennsylvania from 1891 to 1897.  He was a member of the Board of Visitors to the United States Naval Academy in 1893.  Robinson was also a delegate to the Republican National Conventions in 1892, 1896, and 1908.

In 1900, Robinson was appointed by President McKinley as United States marshal for the eastern district of Pennsylvania.  He was reappointed in 1905 by President Theodore Roosevelt and again in 1912 by President Taft.  Robinson served until 1913.

Personal life
In 1874, Robinson married Elizabeth Waddington in St. Louis, Missouri and together they had seven children.  Elizabeth was a granddaughter of Charles Gilpin, the Mayor of Philadelphia from 1850 to 1854.  The couple met during summer vacations in Cresson, Pennsylvania.

Robinson was a member of the Independent Order of Odd Fellows, the American Protestant Association, Knights of Pythias, Order of Chosen Friends, Knights of the Golden Eagle, Improved Order of Red Men, Independent Order of Mechanics and the Bradbury Post No. 149 Grand Army of the Republic.

Robinson died in Philadelphia, Pennsylvania and is interred at the Allegheny Cemetery in Pittsburgh, Pennsylvania.

Bibliography
Robinson, John B. Midshipman to Congress. Privately Printed in Media, Pennsylvania, 1916.

References

|-

|-

1846 births
1933 deaths
19th-century American newspaper editors
19th-century American politicians
Amherst College alumni
Burials at Allegheny Cemetery
Editors of Pennsylvania newspapers
Republican Party members of the Pennsylvania House of Representatives
Republican Party Pennsylvania state senators
Politicians from Pittsburgh
Pennsylvania lawyers
People from Media, Pennsylvania
Union Navy sailors
United States Marshals
United States Naval Academy alumni
Republican Party members of the United States House of Representatives from Pennsylvania
Members of the Odd Fellows